AEW Dynamite, also known as Wednesday Night Dynamite or simply Dynamite, is an American professional wrestling television program produced by the American promotion All Elite Wrestling (AEW). It airs every Wednesday at 8 p.m. Eastern Time (ET) on TBS. The show originally aired on TBS's sister channel, TNT, from October 2019 to December 2021. Dynamite is the first professional wrestling program to air on TBS since the final episode of WCW Thunder on March 21, 2001. 

Since premiering, Dynamite  has received widespread critical acclaim, with praise for its storylines, characters, and match quality. In 2020, TV Guide listed Dynamite at 57 of the top 100 shows on TV, saying "AEW Dynamites arrival was an electric jolt to mainstream wrestling, which had gotten creatively stagnant over the last few years."

History
All Elite Wrestling (AEW) was launched in January 2019. In addition to filing trademarks for the promotion's name, several other trademarks were filed at the time, including Tuesday Night Dynamite, presumably a name for a television show. In June 2019, AEW filed an additional trademark for Wednesday Night Dynamite, leading to many sources believing the show would air on Wednesday nights under this name.

On May 15, 2019, AEW and WarnerMedia announced a deal for a weekly prime-time show airing live on TNT, the former broadcaster of World Championship Wrestling (WCW). They would also stream live events and pay-per-views on B/R Live in the United States and Canada. In April, veteran commentator Jim Ross confirmed the show would be a weekly two-hour show. During AEW's Fight for the Fallen event, AEW wrestler Chris Jericho revealed the show would begin airing in October. On July 24, AEW announced the show would premiere on Wednesday, October 2, and would broadcast from the Capital One Arena in Washington, D.C.; the show sold out within 3 hours of tickets going on sale. AEW President and Chief Executive Officer Tony Khan said that they chose to air the show on Wednesday nights instead of Tuesday nights because TNT airs the National Basketball Association (NBA) on Tuesday and Thursday nights, and it also prevented competition against the National Football League (NFL) on Thursday nights, as Khan also owns an NFL franchise.

In August 2019, WWE announced that it was moving their WWE Network show NXT to the USA Network and expanding the program to a live, two-hour broadcast in the same timeslot as AEW's upcoming show. NXT premiered on USA on September 18, two weeks before AEW's broadcast debut on TNT. On August 30, the day before AEW's pay-per-view All Out, TNT aired a one-hour special called Countdown to All Out at 10pm Eastern Time (ET), which averaged 390,000 viewers.

Like they had done for each of their pay-per-view events, AEW began a "Road to" YouTube series on September 4 entitled The Road to AEW on TNT to build anticipation for the debut broadcast of the show. On September 19, 2019, the show's name was revealed as Dynamite. A two-hour preview show called Countdown to All Elite Wrestling: Dynamite aired on October 1 at 8pm ET; it averaged 631,000 viewers.

On October 2, 2019, Dynamite debuted on TNT which averaged 1.409 million viewers, which made it the largest television debut on TNT in the past five years. Also on October 2, NXT would make their two-hour debut on USA Network (the previous two episodes featured the first hour on USA with the second hour on the WWE Network), and they averaged 891,000 viewers. Dynamite beat out NXT in viewership and more than doubled its competition in the key adults 18–49 demographic, scoring 878,000 viewers compared to NXTs 414,000. This would also mark the beginning of the "Wednesday Night Wars". Prior to and after the episode, dark matches were filmed to air on AEW's YouTube show called Dark, which began airing on the following Tuesday (except before pay-per-view events, where the episodes air Fridays). Despite AEW's initial attempts to avoid conflicts with the NBA games, AEW had to run Dynamite on Thursdays, and even on a Saturday, due to the NBA playoffs. Dynamite was the first wrestling show to air on TNT since the final episode of WCW Monday Nitro on March 26, 2001.

Due to the COVID-19 pandemic that began in March 2020, which caused restrictions for live events around the world, AEW ran empty arena shows from March 18–25 and again from May 6–August 19 from Daily's Place in Jacksonville, Florida, and taped six weeks of shows from March 31 to April 2 from One Fall Power Factory in Norcross, Georgia, AEW's de facto training facility. During these broadcasts, AEW used their employees and other in-ring talent to serve as the live audience for matches when they were not involved in matches or other on-air segments. AEW later began allowing more family and friends of essential personnel to attend, and on August 27, 2020 (moved to Thursday because of the NBA playoffs), AEW resumed live audiences from Daily's Place, though to a limited capacity of 10–15% of the venue. During the pandemic, in order to allow more time off, AEW often taped two weeks of shows in two days (live Wednesday, then a taping Thursday), which allowed wrestlers a week off. This procedure also allowed AEW to pre-tape Thanksgiving and Christmas shows in advance using the format. AEW then began running shows at full capacity of Daily's Place in May 2021. Also in May, AEW announced that they would be returning to live touring, beginning with a special episode of Dynamite titled Road Rager on July 7, in turn becoming the first major professional wrestling promotion to resume live touring during the pandemic. Road Rager was also the first in a four-week span of special Dynamite episodes called the "Welcome Back" tour, which continued with the two-part Fyter Fest on July 14 and 21 and concluded with Fight for the Fallen on July 28.

In regard to the addition of Rampage, WarnerMedia had asked Khan if he would rather expand Dynamite to three hours, but he rejected the notion, stating that he did not want to run Dynamite for that length as he really wanted that third hour as a separate show on a different night. He also claimed that Rampage would not be a secondary show to Dynamite, and that it would be its partner or its equivalent. He further said that Dynamite and Rampage would be AEW's core properties, while their YouTube shows, Dark and Elevation, would be their peripheral properties, essentially their developmental shows.

It was announced on October 25, 2021, that Dynamite would start airing live from coast to coast starting with the October 27 episode (the show's return to Wednesday nights after two weeks due to TNT's coverage of the NHL). This lasted until Dynamites move to TBS.

On January 5, 2022, Dynamite moved from TNT to TBS for the first professional wrestling program to air on TBS since 2001.

Special episodes

Roster

The wrestlers featured on All Elite Wrestling take part in scripted feuds and storylines. Wrestlers are portrayed as heroes, villains, or less distinguishable characters in scripted events that build tension and culminate in a wrestling match.

Commentators

Ring announcers

Broadcasting
In the United States, Dynamite airs live Wednesdays on TBS at 8pm ET. On January 15, 2020, it was announced that Warner Bros. Discovery had extended the contract for the series through 2023. The show originally aired on TBS's sister channel, TNT, from October 2019 to December 2021.

On September 25, 2019, AEW announced an international streaming deal with FITE TV primarily for regions outside of the United States and Canada via the "AEW Plus" package, which includes live streaming and replay access of Dynamite in simulcast with its U.S. airing.

Canada
In Canada, Bell Media's TSN acquired broadcast rights to Dynamite, marking the return of professional wrestling to the network after WWE Raw moved to rival network The Score (now Sportsnet 360) in 2006. The show is broadcast in simulcast with TNT in the U.S (but is subject to scheduling) and is streamed on TSN Direct as well as TSN's website.  Starting August 24, 2022, Dynamite would also air in French on Réseau des sports (RDS). On December 30, 2022, AEW would stop airing on Réseau des sports (RDS) due to the network's budget constraints.

Europe
In the United Kingdom, AEW has a deal with ITV network to broadcast AEW shows, with Dynamite airing on ITV4 every Friday night, with repeats every Monday night on ITV1. It is also available to view on their streaming service ITVX.

On October 22, 2019, TNT Serie announced a deal to air Dynamite on Friday nights in Germany.
On October 24, 2019, Toonami announced a deal to air Dynamite on Tuesday nights in France.
On July 21, 2020, Sky Sport and AEW announced a deal to air Dynamite on Friday nights in Italy, replacing WWE programming. AEW also aired on Sport Extra in Romania from 2020 until 2022. Dynamite aired in Poland from March 5 until August 27, 2022 on Warner TV. In Spain, AEW announced that was going to air Dynamite on TNT starting on June 17, 2022, and later live from June 19, 2022. As of 2023, in some European markets (including countries like Portugal, Sweden, Poland, Turkey, Romania and Czech Republic), Dynamite (and other AEW events such as PPVs, Rampage, Dark, Elevation and Battle of the Belts) are available on DAZN.

Latin America
On October 22, 2020, AEW reached an agreement with the digital platform with Pluto TV broadcasting its repeat events (including past pay-per-view) with commentators in Spanish from Latin America.

On November 22, 2020, Dynamite began airing on Space, a WarnerMedia International channel in Brazil and on Space's Spanish feed, available throughout Latin America on Sundays. On September 30, 2022, it was announced that AEW would stop airing on Space in Latin America on October 1, with Brazil following on December 30.

Africa
Dynamite began airing on TNT Africa on February 5, 2021, in English-speaking countries of Sub-Saharan Africa. The show airs every Sunday morning at 10 AM CAT, four days after the U.S. broadcast.

Asia
In India, AEW is announced to be airing Dynamite on Eurosport starting on August 15, 2021, and later live from August 19, 2021, every Thursday on 5:30am IST. Dynamite began airing on Premier Sports in the Philippines on September 25, 2021. On April 8, 2022, it was announced that as part of the AEW and NJPW working relationship that Dynamite would air in Japan on NJPW World.

Oceania
Dynamite started airing on ESPN2 from 16 February 2023 in Australia, New Zealand, Fiji, Samoa, Tonga, Cook Islands, Solomon Islands, Niue, Nauru, Vanuatu, Kiribati, Northern Marianas, Tokelau, Tahiti, Tuvalu, New Caledonia, American Samoa, Marshall Islands, Palau, Federated States of Micronesia, Papua New Guinea, and Wallis and Futuna.

Broadcast history

See also

List of All Elite Wrestling special events
List of professional wrestling television series

References

External links
 
 
 

Dynamite
2019 American television series debuts
2010s American television series
2020s American television series
American live television series
American professional wrestling television series
English-language television shows
TBS (American TV channel) original programming
TNT (American TV network) original programming
Wrestling Observer Newsletter award winners